Stenoderini is a tribe of beetles in the subfamily Cerambycinae, containing the following genera and species:

 Cacodrotus Broun, 1893
 Cacodrotus bifasciatus Broun, 1893
 Calliprason White, 1843
 Calliprason costifer (Broun, 1886)
 Calliprason elegans (Sharp, 1877)
 Calliprason marginatum White, 1846
 Calliprason pallidus Pascoe, 1875
 Calliprason sinclairi White, 1843
 Demomisis Pascoe, 1867
 Demomisis filum Pascoe, 1867
 Drototelus Broun, 1903
 Drototelus elegans (Brookes, 1927)
 Drototelus politus Broun, 1903
 Drototelus rarus Wang & Lu, 2004
 Leptachrous Bates, 1874
 Leptachrous strigipennis (Westwood, 1845)
 Ophryops White, 1846
 Ophryops aegrotus Bates, 1876
 Ophryops dispar Sharp, 1886
 Ophryops fuscicollis Broun, 1913
 Ophryops medius Broun, 1913
 Ophryops pallidus White, 1846
 Ophryops pseudofuscicollis Lu & Wang, 2004
 Simocrysa Pascoe, 1871
 Simocrysa discolor Pascoe, 1871
 Simocrysa tricolor McKeown, 1942
 Stenoderus Dejean, 1821
 Stenoderus concolor MacLeay, 1826
 Stenoderus opacicollis Aurivillius, 1917
 Stenoderus ostricilla Newman, 1850
 Stenoderus quietus Newman, 1857
 Stenoderus suturalis (Olivier, 1795)
 Syllitosimilis McKeown, 1938
 Syllitosimilis aberrans McKeown, 1938
 Syllitus Pascoe, 1859
 Syllitus acanthias McKeown, 1937
 Syllitus adonarensis Jordan, 1894
 Syllitus albipennis Pascoe, 1869
 Syllitus araucariae McKeown, 1938
 Syllitus argillaceus McKeown, 1937
 Syllitus bellulus McKeown, 1942
 Syllitus beltrani Cerda, 1968
 Syllitus bicolor (Schwarzer, 1924)
 Syllitus bipunctatus Waterhouse, 1877
 Syllitus brimblecombei McKeown, 1938
 Syllitus buloloensis Gressitt, 1959
 Syllitus cassiniae McKeown, 1938
 Syllitus centrocrus McKeown, 1938
 Syllitus chilensis Cerda, 1953
 Syllitus cylindricus Germain, 1899
 Syllitus deustus (Newman, 1841)
 Syllitus divergens McKeown, 1937
 Syllitus dubius McKeown, 1938
 Syllitus elguetai Cerda, 1991
 Syllitus froggatti McKeown, 1937
 Syllitus fulvipennis Gahan, 1893
 Syllitus grammicus (Pascoe, 1840)
 Syllitus heros Blackburn, 1900
 Syllitus insularis Gressitt, 1959
 Syllitus leoensis Gilmour, 1961
 Syllitus microps Blackburn, 1900
 Syllitus minor Gressitt, 1959
 Syllitus minutus McKeown, 1937
 Syllitus niger Gressitt, 1959
 Syllitus papuanus Gestro, 1875
 Syllitus parryi Pascoe, 1862
 Syllitus pseudocupes (Fairmaire & Germain, 1864)
 Syllitus rectus (Newman, 1841)
 Syllitus schajovskoii Bosq, 1953
 Syllitus sexlineatus Gressitt, 1951
 Syllitus sinuaticosta McKeown, 1938
 Syllitus sinuatus McKeown, 1937
 Syllitus spinosus Gahan, 1915
 Syllitus stellamontis Gressitt, 1959
 Syllitus tabidus Pascoe, 1871
 Syllitus terminatus Pascoe, 1871
 Syllitus timorensis Gilmour, 1961
 Syllitus tuberculatus McKeown, 1938
 Syllitus undulatus Heller, 1914
 Syllitus uniformis Blackburn, 1893
 Syllitus unistriatus McKeown, 1942
 Votum Broun, 1880
 Votum mundum Broun, 1880

References

 
Cerambycinae